Partenope was the name of at least two ships of the Italian Navy and may refer to:

 , a  launched in 1889 and sunk in 1918
 , a  launched in 1937 and scuttled in 1943

Italian Navy ship names